(also known as J-Town or historically as Japanese Town, or "Nihonmachi" ("Japan town", in Japanese)) is a neighborhood in the Western Addition district of San Francisco, California.

Japantown comprises about 6 city blocks and is considered one of the largest and oldest ethnic enclaves in the United States.

Location

The main thoroughfare is Post Street, between Fillmore Street (to the west) and Laguna Street (to the east). The Japantown neighborhood is generally considered to be bordered on the north by Bush or Pine Street, and on the south by Geary Boulevard.

Its focal point is the Japan Center, which opened in 1968, and is the site of three Japanese-oriented shopping centers. The San Francisco Peace Pagoda, also at the Japan Center, is a five-tiered concrete stupa designed by Japanese architect Yoshiro Taniguchi and presented to San Francisco by the people of Osaka, Japan.

History
Up until 1906, San Francisco had been the main U.S. port of entry for Asian immigration and had the largest ethnic Japanese concentration of any city in the United States. Prior to the 1906 San Francisco earthquake, San Francisco had two Japantowns, one on the outskirts of Chinatown, the other in the South of Market area. After 1906, Japanese immigrants began moving to San Francisco's Western Addition, which then became San Francisco's main Japantown, with a smaller one in the South Park area. The South Park area was located between the docks used by Japanese shipping companies and the Southern Pacific Railroad Station, and primarily served travelers between Japan and the United States. The South Park district businesses suffered following the passage of the Immigration Act of 1924.

By 1940, the Western Addition Japantown area (referred to as Nihonjin-machi) was one of the largest such enclaves of Japanese outside Japan, as it took an appearance similar to the Ginza district in Tokyo. The ethnic Japanese population numbered over 5,000, and there were more than 200 Japanese-owned businesses.

In February 1942, U.S. President Franklin D. Roosevelt signed Executive Order 9066, which forced all Japanese of birth or descent, including Japanese-American citizens of the United States, to be relocated from the Pacific coast and interned. By 1943 many large sections of the neighborhood remained vacant due to the forced internment. The void was quickly filled by thousands of African Americans who had left the South to find wartime industrial jobs in California as part of the Great Migration.

Following the war, some Japanese Americans returned, followed by new Japanese immigrants as well as investment from the Japanese Government and Japanese companies. However, many did not return to the neighborhood and instead settled in other parts of the city, or out to the suburbs altogether. This was further exacerbated by the city's efforts to rejuvenate the neighborhood initiated by M. Justin Herman in the Western Addition in the 1960s through the 1980s.

In 1957, San Francisco entered into a sister city relationship with the city of Osaka, hence the nickname "Little Osaka". Osaka was San Francisco's oldest sister city. In commemoration of their 50th anniversary, one block of Buchanan Street in Japantown was renamed Osaka Way on September 8, 2007. However, Osaka ended the 60-year relationship in 2018 after then mayor Ed Lee accepted a statue memorializing comfort women in 2017. The statue is currently erected on public property in San Francisco's Chinatown.

Japantown Bowl was founded in 1976 amidst urban renewal in the Fillmore District, San Francisco in the 1970s. When the building was put up for sale, Supervisor Mabel Teng suggested that the city buy the building if negotiations between private investors failed. The Japanese Cultural and Community Center of Northern California (JCCCNC) offered to buy the building but was rejected. It was the largest of the three remaining bowling alleys in San Francisco when it closed in September 2000. The lot has since been converted into mixed-use housing units.

A pair of cherry blossom trees were planted by the JCCCNC outside of the center in 1994 to commemorate a visit by Emperor Emeritus Akihito and Empress Emerita Michiko of Japan during their 2-week tour of the United States. However, the trees were hacked down over the course of three days by vandals in January 2021.

In 2020 due to the COVID-19 pandemic in the United States, malls in San Francisco were ordered to remain temporarily closed whenever cases got high within the whole city followed by Los Angeles and San Diego. This, in effect, has forced restaurants in the neighborhood, many of whom reside in Japan Center, to turn to a take-out/delivery-only model. The JCCCNC have organized socially distanced outdoor seating and ordering areas in the Peace Plaza. However, some businesses have still remained closed for the duration of the pandemic and have reported losses of 50%.

Attractions and characteristics
The area is home to Japanese cuisine (and some Korean and Chinese) restaurants, supermarkets, indoor shopping malls, hotels, banks, and other shops, including one of the few U.S. branches of the large Kinokuniya bookstore chain. Most of these businesses are located in the commercial Japan Center of the neighborhood, in a large shopping mall built in the 1960s as part of urban renewal efforts and is run by Japanese retailer Kintetsu.

Festivals
San Francisco's Japantown celebrates two major festivals every year: The Northern California Cherry Blossom Festival (held for two weekends every April), and the Nihonmachi Street Fair, held one weekend in the month of August.

The Cherry Blossom Festival takes place over the course of two weekends. During the first weekend, the Northern California Cherry Blossom Queen Program takes place at the Kabuki Theatre, where women of Japanese/Japanese-American descent are chosen to represent, learn about, and serve their community. During the Sunday parade, the queen and princesses are presented on a float.

Government and infrastructure
The San Francisco Police Department Northern Station serves Japantown.

Education
The area is within the San Francisco Unified School District. Rosa Parks Elementary School is located near Japantown. It houses the Japanese Bilingual Bicultural Program (JBBP). In the winter of 2005 Rosa Parks had 233 students, which filled less than half of the school. That winter, SFUSD proposed closing the school and merging it with another elementary school. Parents protested in favor of keeping the school open. SFUSD moved the Japanese Bilingual Bicultural Program into Rosa Parks. As of November 2006, almost half of the students in the regular Rosa Parks program are African-American and one-third of the students in the JBBP program are Japanese.

See also

 49-Mile Scenic Drive
 History of the Japanese in San Francisco
 Japanese American internment
 Japanese American National Library
 Japanese Cultural and Community Center of Northern California
 Japantown — for other Japanese neighborhoods
 Kinmon Gakuen
 Neighborhoods of San Francisco

References

Further reading

External links

Discover San Francisco Japantown
Map of San Francisco Japantown
San Francisco Japantown Guide
Japantown Task Force, Inc.
Japanese Cultural and Community Center of Northern California
Google Maps view of the Peace Pagoda
SFcityguides.org: free walking tours of Japantown
Nihonmachi Street Fair
Northern California Cherry Blossom Festival
 

Japanese-American culture in San Francisco
Japantowns in the United States
Neighborhoods in San Francisco
Western Addition, San Francisco
Cherry blossom festivals
Ethnic enclaves in California